North Hill is a neighborhood in Minot, North Dakota, located north of the Souris River, above the Souris River Valley.  It is a primarily residential neighborhood, though there are industries and businesses in the area, primarily along North Broadway and 21st Ave NW.  North Hill is also home to Minot International Airport.

Geography

North Hill is located north of the Souris River Valley.  The neighborhood is bound by the Souris River Valley to the south and the city limits on the west, north and east. The major streets through North Hill include North Broadway and 21st Avenue NW.  Other important roads are 3rd Street NE, 8th Street NW and Sixteenth Street NW.  All the streets in Minot are gridded, based on the intersection of Central Avenue and Main Street downtown.  All of the roads in North Hill are north of Central Avenue.  Main Street in North Hill divides streets east and west.  Main Street, however, only exists in sections on North Hill, due to the presence of the hill and the airport.  North Hill can most easily be accessed via the West Bypass, the Northeast Bypass, or North Broadway.

Economy

Top employers

The top employers on North Hill, according to the Minot Area Development Corporation in the first quarter of 2011 are:

Attractions
 Dakota Territory Air Museum
 Lucky Strike Lounge and Casino

Restaurants
Souris River Brewing
10 North Main
Starving Rooster
Hangar Grill
Hardee's
KFC
Lucky Strike Restaurant
Primo
Sevens

Parks and recreation

 Cameron Indoor Tennis Center
 North Hill Bowl
 Optimist Park
 Polaris Park
 Sertoma Softball Complex
 Advanced Sports Kinetics (ASK) gym/training center

Education

Erik Ramstad Middle School, was formerly located on Lincoln Avenue in the Souris River Valley, but was badly flooded in the Souris River flood in 2011.  The school named for one of the founders of Minot, Erik Ramstad is being rebuilt on North Hill. In the fall of 2011, students at Ramstad Middle School began attending classes at the Minot Municipal Auditorium downtown.  Temporary classroom units on the property were also needed to accommodate students.  On August 23, 2012, a groundbreaking ceremony for the new school was held in North Hill for the $35 million school  The new Ramstad will be the first middle school located on North Hill, as Jim Hill Middle School is located on South Hill and Memorial Middle School is located at the Minot Air Force Base.  North Hill is also home to Lewis and Clark Elementary School, which is located on Eighth Street NW.  The Mouzafarov Institute of Dance and Ballet Theatre is also located on North Hill.

Transportation
The main roads accessing North Hill are the US 83 Bypass, the Northeast Bypass and Broadway.  Broadway carries US 83 through downtown.

Minot International Airport

North Hill is home to Minot International Airport, the second busiest airport in the state, behind Hector International Airport in Fargo.  In 2012, the airport had over 224,000 boardings, a record number, which was a sixty-six percent increase from 2011.  The airport is served by Allegiant, Delta, Frontier and United, which fly to Denver, Las Vegas, Minneapolis and Phoenix. The airport is currently in the planning stages of a construction project for a new terminal and airport expansion project.  Alamo, Avis, Enterprise, Hertz and National have car rental counters at the Minot Airport. Two local cab companies, Central Cab and Taxi 9000, also serve the airport. The Magic City pedestrian bridge also connects the airport with the Grand International and the west side of North Broadway.

Bus Service
 Minot City Transit operates several bus routes, which serve North Hill on weekdays.  Cash fare or tokens can be purchased upon boarding the bus.  In the mornings, bus routes connect North Hill with Minot State University and Downtown Minot on the North Route and the Valley View neighborhood on North Hill with Minot State University and downtown on the North Central Route.  In the afternoon, North Hill is linked with Minot State and downtown on the North Route.

Future development

Several housing and retail develops are underway in the North Hill neighborhood with more planned.  One such development being built is the Northern Lights Addition, a 342-acre site in the northwest part of the neighborhood.  The Northern Lights Neighborhood will also be home to the new Ramstad Middle School.  On July 11, 2012, ground was broken on a new retail and housing development, centered on a MarketPlace Food grocery store.  The grocery store, set to open in 2013, is expected to create about one thousand jobs.  Apartments are being constructed over the additional retail/office space in the complex.  A number of hotels have also been constructed recently along North Broadway and the Bypass.

Events

Soaring over the Souris air show, July

Emergency Services

Hospital

St. Alexius Medical Clinic is located on Eighth Street NW between Twenty-Sixth and Thirtieth Avenues.

References

Neighborhoods in North Dakota
Neighborhoods in Minot, North Dakota